Matcham may refer to:

Matcham, New South Wales, Australia

People
Charles Matcham (1862–1911), English civil engineer and businessman
Frank Matcham (1854–1920), English architect
George Matcham (1753–1833), British civil servant in India, and traveller

See also